The B-series trains are a class of electric multiple unit built by Downer Rail in Maryborough, Queensland for Transperth between 2004 and 2019.

History 
Perth's first electrified trains, the two-carriage A-Series, entered service in September 1991.

The B-series trains are cleared to operate on the Midland, Armadale/Thornlie and Fremantle lines and are regularly used on these lines alongside the older A-Series. However, not all stations on these lines are capable of handling six-car sets as the platforms are not long enough, so they are usually run as 3-car sets. There are reported problems with the acceleration/deceleration systems with the closely spaced stations. Platforms at the original stations on the Joondalup line had to be lengthened to accommodate the six-car trains, as did Platform 1 at Showgrounds and both platforms at West Leederville. The Mandurah line stations, along with Butler, Clarkson, Currambine and Greenwood on the Joondalup line, and the rebuilt Kelmscott station on the Armadale line were built with longer platforms.

In May 2002, a $437 million contract for the construction of the initial 31 three car B-series trains and the Nowergup depot was awarded to EDI Rail–Bombardier Transportation Joint Venture. These railcars were purchased to provide enough capacity for the Joondalup line extension to Clarkson, the Thornlie line spur from the Armadale line, and the Mandurah line. Of the total contract value, $24 million was for the railcar construction, $34 million was for the Nowergup depot construction, and $114 million was for maintenance of the railcars for ten years.

In December 2006, the government signed another contract, worth $160 million, with EDI Rail–Bombardier Transportation Joint Venture for 15 more three car B-series trains to be used on the Joondalup and Mandurah lines. In 2009, the first of these additional railcars were delivered, allowing several A-series trains to be moved from the Joondalup and Mandurah lines to the other lines on the network, and for frequencies to increase on the Mandurah, Joondalup, Fremantle and Midland lines. The first entered service on 28 June 2009.

In May 2011, the government announced 15 more three car B-series trains worth $164 million would be ordered to cater for the extension of the Joondalup line to Butler, and a general increase in capacity on the network. These trains were ordered in July 2011. In August 2012, this order was increased by two, to cater for the planned Aubin Grove station, and in November 2012, this order was increased by five, to make the total order be for 22 three car trains. The final cost was $243 million. With the final delivery from that order, all trains operating on the Joondalup and Mandurah lines were B-series trains.

Funding for an additional 10 sets was announced in the May 2016 state budget with delivery planned for 2018-20 these sets will provide additional capacity on the existing network as well as service the Forrestfield–Airport Link when it opens in 2022. The B series fleet will total 78 3-carriage sets. As of April 2019 all 78 3-car sets have been delivered with 78 3-car sets in service

Additional accessories 
Since early-2016, B-series sets 115 and onwards have been fitted with USB charging ports as part of a 6-month trial.

See also 
 Transperth A-series train
 Transperth C-series train
 Queensland Rail Suburban multiple unit
 Queensland Rail Interurban multiple unit
 V/Line VLocity DMU
 Adelaide Metro 4000 Series

References

Bibliography 

 

Electric multiple units of Western Australia
Public transport in Perth, Western Australia
Train-related introductions in 2004
Bombardier Transportation multiple units
25 kV AC multiple units